Ryan Brooks (born April 12, 1988) is an American professional basketball player for Tigers Tübingen of the German Basketball Bundesliga.

Brooks was born in New Orleans, Louisiana, and raised in Narberth, Pennsylvania. He played college basketball at Temple University.

College career
As a senior at Temple, Brooks was the team's highest scorer, with an average of 14.3 points per game, and averages of 4.2 rebounds and 2.3 assists per game. He was selected for the all-Atlantic 10 second team and finished his career with 1,225 points.

References

External links

 Eurocup Profile
 German BBL Profile
 Eurobasket Profile

1988 births
Living people
African-American basketball players
American expatriate basketball people in Finland
American expatriate basketball people in France
American expatriate basketball people in Germany
American men's basketball players
Basketball players from New Orleans
Giessen 46ers players
Guards (basketball)
JDA Dijon Basket players
Lower Merion High School alumni
Namika Lahti players
People from Narberth, Pennsylvania
Skyliners Frankfurt players
Telekom Baskets Bonn players
Temple Owls men's basketball players
Tigers Tübingen players
21st-century African-American sportspeople
20th-century African-American people